The Akai S900 is a 12-bit sampler, with a variable sample rate from 7.5 kHz through to 40 kHz.  It was common in recording studios until it was superseded two years later by the S1000.

An expanded version, the Akai S950, was released in 1988 alongside the higher end S1000. The S950 imported some of the S1000's improvements, including timestretching (allowing the user to change a sample's length and pitch independently of one another), and it increased the maximum sample rate to 48 kHz. Unlike the S1000 series, the S900 series allows a sample to loop alternating forwards and backwards.

Notable users include The 45 King (who named his hit "The 900 Number" after the sampler), Juan Atkins, Beatmasters, Black Box, Ian Boddy, Enya, Fatboy Slim (who nearly exclusively uses a pair of S950s), Front 242, KLF, The Bomb Squad, Prince Paul, Renegade Soundwave, and Tangerine Dream.

References 

	
	
	
	
	
	
	
	
	
	
	
	
	

Akai synthesizers
Samplers (musical instrument)